Issam Shaitit (Arabic:عصام سحيتيت) (born 14 February 2000) is a Moroccan footballer who plays as a winger for Ajman Club.

Career statistics

Club

External links

References

2000 births
Living people
Moroccan footballers
Moroccan expatriate footballers
Olympique Club de Khouribga players
Ajman Club players
UAE Pro League players
Association football wingers
Expatriate footballers in the United Arab Emirates
Moroccan expatriate sportspeople in the United Arab Emirates
Place of birth missing (living people)